Princess Maximiliana Josepha Caroline of Bavaria (21 July 1810 – 4 February 1821), was a Princess of Bavaria, daughter of King Maximilian I Joseph of Bavaria and Queen Caroline of Baden.

Biography 

Maximiliana was born in Nymphenburg Palace, the summer residence of the kings of Bavaria. She was the last child of Maximilian I Joseph of Bavaria and his second wife, Caroline of Baden. Her mother gave birth to eight children; her eldest brother, Maximilian, died in childhood. Maximiliana's siblings included King Ludwig I, Caroline Augusta, Empress of Austria, Elisabeth, Queen consort of Prussia, Amalie, Queen consort of Saxony and Sophie, Archduchess of Austria; as well as Ludovika, Duchess in Bavaria, mother of Franz Josef's consort, Empress Elisabeth of Austria (Sissi).

In 1821, Maximiliana fell ill with typhus, and died at the age of ten. Her death was a devastating blow to her mother. She was buried at the Theatine Church, Munich.

Paintings 
In 1814, Maximiliana was immortalized by the painter Joseph Karl Stieler in an oil painting which appears embracing a lamb with her twin sisters Elisabeth and Amalie. After her death, her mother ordered more paintings to Joseph Stieler. Stieler painted her on her deathbed, and also made a full-length portrait of the princess.

Ancestry

References

Literature 
 
 
 

1810 births
1821 deaths
House of Wittelsbach
Bavarian princesses
Nobility from Munich
German Roman Catholics
Burials at the Theatine Church, Munich
Royalty and nobility who died as children
Daughters of kings